The 448th Missile Squadron is an inactive United States Air Force unit.  It was last assigned to the 321st Missile Group at Grand Forks Air Force Base, North Dakota, where it was equipped with the LGM-30G Minuteman III Intercontinental ballistic missile (ICBM), with a mission of nuclear deterrence.

The squadron was first activated in 1942 as the 448th Bombardment Squadron and was equipped with North American B-25 Mitchell medium bombers.  After training in the United States, it deployed to the Mediterranean Theater of Operations, serving in combat until 1945.  The squadron earned a Distinguished Unit Citation for its actions.  After the war, it returned to the United States and was inactivated.  From 1947 through 1949, it served in the reserve, but does not appear to have been fully manned or equipped.

The squadron was activated in Strategic Air Command in 1953 and served with Boeing B-47 Stratojets until inactivating in 1961.  it was activated at Grand Forks AFB, North Dakota in 1965 as the 448th Strategic Missile Squadron.

History

World War II
Activated in mid-1942 as a North American B-25 Mitchell medium bomber squadron, trained by Third Air Force in the southeastern United States.   Deployed to the Mediterranean Theater of Operations, being assigned to Twelfth Air Force in Algeria in early 1943.  In North Africa, the squadron engaged primarily in support and interdictory operations, bombing marshalling yards, rail lines, highways, bridges, viaducts, troop concentrations, gun emplacements, shipping, harbors, and other objectives in North Africa.

The squadron also engaged in psychological warfare missions, dropping propaganda leaflets behind enemy lines. Took part in the Allied operations against Axis forces in North Africa during March–May 1943, the reduction of Pantelleria and Lampedusa islands during June, the invasion of Sicily in July, the landing at Salerno in September, the Allied advance toward Rome during January–June 1944, the invasion of Southern France in August 1944, and the Allied operations in northern Italy from September 1944 to April 1945.   Inactivated in Italy after the German Capitulation in September 1945.

Reactivated as part of the reserve in 1947 and then inactivated in 1949 due to budget cuts.

Strategic Air Command
The squadron was reactivated in 1959 as a Strategic Air Command Boeing B-47 Stratojet squadron. Trained in air refueling and strategic bombardment operations with the B-47. in 1961, the squadron began transferring its B-47s to other SAC wings and became non-operational as part of the phaseout of the B-47.

Intercontinental ballistic missile squadron
On 1 September 1965 the 446th Strategic Missile Squadron  was organized as a SAC LGM-30F Minuteman II intercontinental ballistic missile squadron. It became operational on 7 December 1966, with a complement of 50 missiles.  Participated in "Project Long Life II", a unique reliability test in which modified Minuteman missiles were fueled to travel a few hundred yards. The first launch from a silo occurred on 19 October 1966 and was declared unsuccessful. Nine days later, a second attempt also failed. A third attempt under "Project Giant Boost" occurred in August 1968 and again proved unsuccessful.

From December 1971 to March 1973, converted to LGM-30G Minuteman III missiles. These missiles represented a significant technological advancement, having multiple independently targetable reentry vehicles (MIRVs). Coordinating the missile changeover required complex planning and execution.

With the restructuring of the Air Force and the disestablishment of Strategic Air Command (SAC) in the early 1990s was reassigned to Air Combat Command in 1992 and then under Air Force Space Command in 1993.

In March 1995, the Base Realignment and Closure (BRAC) Commission selected the 321st Strategic Missile Wing for inactivation.  Squadron was ordered to securely transfer its alert responsibilities to the 341st Missile Wing at Malmstrom Air Force Base, Montana.  Maintained nuclear alert until inactivated in 1997, nearly 40 years after it went on alert.

Lineage
 Constituted as the 448th Bombardment Squadron (Medium) on 19 June 1942
 Activated on 26 June 1942
 Redesignated 448th Bombardment Squadron, Medium on 6 March 1944
 Inactivated on 12 September 1945
 Redesignated 448th Bombardment Squadron, Light on 26 May 1947
 Activated in the reserve on 29 June 1947
 Inactivated on 27 June 1949
 Redesignated 448th Bombardment Squadron, Medium on 30 October 1958
 Activated on 1 February 1959
 Discontinued and inactivated on 25 October 1961
 Redesignated 448th Strategic Missile Squadron (ICBM-Minuteman) on 2 August 1965 and activated (not organized)
 Organized on 15 September 1965
 Redesignated 448th Missile Squadron on 1 September 1991
 Inactivated on 23 September 1997

Assignments
 321st Bombardment Group, 26 June 1942 – 12 September 1945
 321st Bombardment Group, 29 June 1947 – 27 June 1949
 321st Bombardment Wing, 1 February 1959 – 25 October 1961
 321st Strategic Missile Wing (later 321st Missile) Wing), 1 September 1965
 321st Operations Group, 1 September 1991
 321st Missile Group, 1 July 1994 –23 September 1997

Stations

 Barksdale Field, Louisiana, 26 June 1942
 Columbia Army Air Base, South Carolina, c. 1 August 1942
 Walterboro Army Air Field, South Carolina, September 1942
 DeRidder Army Air Base, Louisiana, c. 1 December 1942 – 21 January 1943
 Ain M'lila Airfield, Algeria, 12 March 1943
 Souk-el-Arba Airfield, Tunisia, c. 1 June 1943
 Soliman Airfield, Tunisia, 8 August 1943
 Grottaglie Airfield, Italy, October 1943

 Amendola Airfield, Italy, c. 20 November 1943
 Vincenzo Airfield, Italy, 14 January 1944
 Gaudo Airfield, Italy, February 1944
 Solenzara Air Base, Corsica, France, 23 April 1944
 Falconara Airfield, Italy, 1 April 1945
 Pomigliano Airfield, Italy, c. September-12 September 1945
 Stout Field, Indiana 29 June 1947 – 27 June 1949
 McCoy Air Force Base, Florida, 1 February 1959 – 25 October 1961
 Grand Forks Air Force Base, North Dakota, 1 September 1965 – 23 September 1997

Aircraft and missiles

 North American B-25 Mitchell (1942–1945)
 North American AT-6 Texan (1947–1949)
 Beechcraft AT-11 Kansan (1947–1949)
 Boeing B-47E Stratojet, 1953–1961
 LGM-30F Minuteman II, 1965–1973
 LGM-30G Minuteman III, 1972–1997
448th Missile Squadron Launch Facilities
 Missile Alert Facilities (K-O flights, each controlling 10 missiles) are located as follows:
 K-00 9.6 mi NE of Finley ND,       
 L-00 10.5 mi W of Hope ND,         
 M-00 3.8 mi SxSE of Hope ND,       
 N-00 6.1 mi S of Hannaford ND,     
 O-00 3.6 mi N of Cooperstown ND,

See also

 List of United States Air Force missile squadrons

References

Notes
 Explanatory notes

 Citations

Bibliography

External links
 Grand Forks AFB Minuteman Missile Site Coordinates

448
Military units and formations in North Dakota